BSS (also known as BooSeokSoon or Seventeen BSS) is the first sub-unit of South Korean boy band Seventeen. Formed in 2018, the group is composed of three Seventeen members: DK, Hoshi and Seungkwan.

Career

2018–present: Debut with "Just Do It" and first comeback
On February 2, 2018, BSS performed the song "Just Do It" for the first time at Seventeen's 2018 Seventeen 2nd Fan Meeting. Later, the band debuted as a sub-unit of Seventeen with the release of their first digital single "Just Do It" on March 21, 2018.

On January 7, 2023, it was announced that BSS would be making their first-ever comeback, almost five years after their debut. The band released their first single album Second Wind on February 6, 2023. On February 15, 2023, BSS received their first ever music show win on Show Champion with "Fighting" featuring Lee Young-ji, followed by wins on M Countdown, Music Bank, Show! Music Core and Inkigayo.

Members
 DK – leader
 Hoshi
 Seungkwan

Discography

Single albums

Singles

Other charted song

Awards and nominations

References

K-pop music groups
Musical groups established in 2018
South Korean boy bands
South Korean dance music groups
Pledis Entertainment artists
Hybe Corporation artists
South Korean idol groups
South Korean pop music groups
Seventeen (South Korean band)
South Korean musical trios
2018 establishments in South Korea